Timirbayevo (Timerbay) is a rural locality (a village) in Kurgatovsky Selsoviet, Mechetlinsky District, Bashkortostan, Russia. The population was 79 as of 2010. There is 1 street.

Geography 
Timirbayevo is located 36 km northeast of Bolsheustyikinskoye (the district's administrative centre) by road. Yulayevo is the nearest rural locality.

References 

Rural localities in Mechetlinsky District